Hassan Ahmed El-Far (21 May 1912 – 8 August 1973) was an Egyptian football midfielder who played for Egypt in the 1934 FIFA World Cup. He also participated in the 1936 Summer Olympics and played for Zamalek SC.

Honours and achievements

Club
Zamalek
Cairo League:(6) 1931–1932,1939–40,1940–41,1943–44,1944–45,1945–46
Egypt Cup:(6) 1931–32,1934–35,1937–38,1940–41,1942–43,1943–44

References

1912 births
1973 deaths
Egyptian footballers
Egypt international footballers
Association football midfielders
Zamalek SC players
1934 FIFA World Cup players
Olympic footballers of Egypt
Footballers at the 1936 Summer Olympics